Hesperentomon dunhuaense is a species of proturan in the family Hesperentomidae.

References

Protura
Articles created by Qbugbot